Revolutionary Marxist Group may refer to:

Revolutionary Marxist Group (Canada)
Revolutionary Marxist Group (Ireland)